Sang et Or means Blood and Gold in French.

Sang et Or may refer to:

Sports 

 Sang et Or, a nickname for the French football club ESA Linas-Montlhéry
 Sang et Or, a nickname for the French football club RC Lens
 Les Sang et Or, a nickname for the French football club Le Mans FC
 Les Sang et Or, a nickname for the Belgian football club A.F.C. Tubize
 Les Sangs et Ors, a nickname for the French football club Calais RUFC

See also 

 Blood and Gold, a horror novel written by Anne Rice